Vivian Beer is an American designer of metal furniture. Her furniture and sculptures primarily take on contemporary and abstract forms focusing on creating objects that interfere with the landscape.

Early life 
In 1977, Beer was born in Bar Harbor, Maine.

Education 
In 2000, Beer received a bachelor's degree in sculpture from the Maine College of Art in Portland, Maine, graduating with honors. in 2004 she received a master's degree in Metalsmithing from the Cranbrook Academy of Art in Bloomfield Hills, Michigan. She has participated in artist residencies since 1996.

Career 
Beer's artwork is often a blend of one of her passions - automotives - and other hardware, typically metal, to create unique and stylish pieces of furniture. Her studio uses many of the same tools an auto body shop would have to mend and paint cars. Her designs involve many complex curves that are not easy to replicate using steel. She must hammer, bend, and then curve the material on an English wheel. Next, they are welded, sandblasted, and finally painted into the desired shapes - all by hand - by Beer. Her projects often include abstract style benches, chairs, and other outdoor sculptures with sleek finishes. Her work is often a collaboration of the surrounding nature and culture of where it will be placed. The variety of designs, textures, patterns, and colors in her assortment of work express this goal. Beer has become a master at crafting hard material into impressive functioning pieces of art.

Recognition 
Beer's success in designing and making furniture has been recognized by many, including Ellen DeGeneres. Beer was featured on Ellen’s Design Challenge, an American furniture design competition, and won the challenge along with a cash prize. Following this win, she was awarded several prestigious fellowships. In particular, the John D. Mineck furniture fellowship granted her the opportunity to travel the country in an RV for inspiration. She had the experience working at the National Air and Space Museum researching American aeronautic design history in which she received the Smithsonian Artist Research Fellowship for. Along with this, she was amongst the few artists to be awarded $50,000 from United States Artists. She was featured on The Take magazine's cover as “Manchester’s Sexy Industrialist” for her fine, yet functional art. Beer was the recipient of the Alumni Achievement Award from Cranbrook Academy, which recognizes alumni who succeed early in their career.

Collections 
Beer's work is in the permanent collections of:
 the Brooklyn Museum,
 the Smithsonian American Art Museum,
 the Currier Museum of Art,
 the Metal Museum, and 
 the Museum of Fine Arts, Boston.

References

Living people
American designers
21st-century American artists
Maine College of Art alumni
1977 births
Cranbrook Academy of Art alumni
21st-century American women artists
Artists from Maine
People from Bar Harbor, Maine
American furniture makers